Polyana is a rural locality (a village) in Sizemskoye Rural Settlement, Sheksninsky District, Vologda Oblast, Russia. The population was 16 as of 2002.

Geography 
Polyana is located 34 km north of Sheksna (the district's administrative centre) by road. Maryino is the nearest rural locality.

References 

Rural localities in Sheksninsky District